The Gold Leaf Awards of 1970, which were the first Juno Awards, were founded by RPM Magazine to honour Canadian music industry achievements. The magazine had honoured musicians in the previous six years using a reader survey until this formal ceremony.

These awards were presented at St. Lawrence Hall in Toronto on 23 February 1970. 250 people attended this inaugural awards ceremony, twice the number who were invited. Winners received walnut wood trophies that resembled metronomes. George Wilson  of CFRB radio was master of ceremonies for these awards and for the subsequent Juno Awards ceremonies until 1974.

Winners

Top Male Singer
Andy Kim

Top Female Vocalist
Ginette Reno

Top Vocal Instrumental Group
The Guess Who

Top Country Male Artist
Tommy Hunter

Top Country Female Artist
Dianne Leigh

Top Country Instrumental Vocal Group
The Mercey Brothers

Top Folksinger (or Group)
Gordon Lightfoot

Canadian Industry Music Industry Man of the Year
Saul Holiff

Best Produced Single
"Which Way You Goin' Billy?", The Poppy Family

Best Produced Middle-of-the-Road Album
Which Way You Goin' Billy?, The Poppy Family

Top Record Company
RCA Records

Top Canadian Content Company
Quality Records

Top Record Company in Promotional Activities
Capitol Records

Special RPM Radio Award For Community Activities
CKLG Vancouver (Now CFOX-FM)

References 
Citations

External links 
Juno Awards official site
Library and Archives Canada: "The RPM Story"
AV Trust: "The RPM Legacy"

1970 awards
1970
Recurring events established in 1970
1970 in Canadian music